Luke Davenport (born 29 May 1993 in Cambridge) is a British racing driver, currently competing in the British Touring Car Championship for Motorbase Performance.

Racing career

Early career

Davenport began his car racing career in 2011, competing in the Ginetta Challenge. Starting in the G20 class, he moved up to the G40 class in 2012 where he remained for the next two seasons culminating in him finishing 4th in the championship in 2013 with one win. In 2014 Davenport moved to the Ginetta GT4 Supercup on the TOCA BTCC support package. He competed for United Autosports with veteran Carl Breeze as his teammate. He finished the season 6th in points with two wins.

Davenport spent the next two seasons in the British GT driving for Tolman Motorsport.

British Touring Car Championship

For the 2017 season, Davenport was signed by Motorbase Performance to compete in the British Touring Car Championship. His teammates are Mat Jackson and Martin Depper.

Britcar Endurance Championship

Davenport is participating in the 2020 season of the Britcar Endurance Championship in a Ligier JS2 R for Reflex Racing with Marcus Vivian. Davenport and Vivian were announced in January 2021 to be again competing with each other in the Ligier for 2021.

Racing record

Complete British Touring Car Championship results
(key) (Races in bold indicate pole position – 1 point awarded just in first race; races in italics indicate fastest lap – 1 point awarded all races; * signifies that driver led race for at least one lap – 1 point given all races)

Complete Britcar results 
(key) (Races in bold indicate pole position in class – 1 point awarded just in first race; races in italics indicate fastest lap in class – 1 point awarded all races;-

References

1993 births
Living people
Sportspeople from Cambridge
English racing drivers
British Touring Car Championship drivers
British GT Championship drivers
Britcar drivers
Ginetta GT4 Supercup drivers
United Autosports drivers
AF Corse drivers
Le Mans Cup drivers